This list comprises widespread modern beliefs about English language usage that are documented by a reliable source to be misconceptions.
  
With no authoritative language academy, guidance on English language usage can come from many sources. This can create problems, as described by Reginald Close: Teachers and textbook writers often invent rules which their students and readers repeat and perpetuate. These rules are usually statements about English usage which the authors imagine to be, as a rule, true. But statements of this kind are extremely difficult to formulate both simply and accurately. They are rarely altogether true; often only partially true; sometimes contradicted by usage itself. Sometimes the contrary to them is also true.

Many usage forms are commonly perceived as nonstandard or errors despite being widely accepted or endorsed by authoritative descriptions.

Perceived violations of correct English usage elicit visceral reactions in many people. For example, respondents to a 1986 BBC poll were asked to submit "the three points of grammatical usage they most disliked". Participants stated that their noted points "'made their blood boil', 'gave a pain to their ear', 'made them shudder', and 'appalled' them".

Grammar

Misconception: A sentence must not end in a preposition. Mignon Fogarty ("Grammar Girl") says, "nearly all grammarians agree that it's fine to end sentences with prepositions, at least in some cases." Fowler's Modern English Usage says, "One of the most persistent myths about prepositions in English is that they properly belong before the word or words they govern and should not be placed at the end of a clause or sentence." Preposition stranding was in use long before any English speakers considered it incorrect. This idea probably began in the 17th century, owing to an essay by the poet John Dryden, and it is still taught in schools at the beginning of the 21st century.  However, "every major grammarian for more than a century has tried to debunk" this idea; "it's perfectly natural to put a preposition at the end of a sentence, and it has been since Anglo-Saxon times." "Great literature from Chaucer to Milton to Shakespeare to the King James version of the Bible was full of so called terminal prepositions." Other grammarians have supported the practice by analogy with Latin, such as Robert Lowth in his 1762 textbook A Short Introduction to English Grammar. The saying "This is the sort of nonsense up with which I will not put", apocryphally attributed to Winston Churchill, satirizes the awkwardness that can result from prohibiting sentence-ending prepositions.

Misconception: Infinitives must not be split. "There is no such rule" against splitting an infinitive, according to The Oxford Guide to Plain English, and it has "never been wrong to 'split' an infinitive". In some cases it may be preferable to split an infinitive. According to Phillip Howard, the "grammatical 'rule' that most people retain from their schooldays is the one about not splitting infinitives", and it is a "great Shibboleth of English syntax". According to the University of Chicago Writing Program, "Professional linguists have been snickering at it for decades, yet children are still taught this false 'rule'." In his grammar book A Plea for the Queen's English (1864), Henry Alford claimed that because "to" was part of the infinitive, the parts were inseparable. This was in line with a 19th-century movement among grammarians to transfer Latin rules to the English language. In Latin, infinitives are single words (e.g., "amare, cantare, audire"), making split infinitives impossible.

Misconception: Conjunctions such as "and" and "but" must not begin a sentence. Those who impose this rule on themselves are following a modern English "rule" that was not used historically. Jeremy Butterfield described this perceived prohibition as one of "the folk commandments of English usage". The Chicago Manual of Style says: There is a widespread belief—one with no historical or grammatical foundation—that it is an error to begin a sentence with a conjunction such as 'and', 'but', or 'so'. In fact, a substantial percentage (often as many as 10 percent) of the sentences in first-rate writing begin with conjunctions. It has been so for centuries, and even the most conservative grammarians have followed this practice.

Regarding the word "and", Fowler's Modern English Usage states, "There is a persistent belief that it is improper to begin a sentence with And, but this prohibition has been cheerfully ignored by standard authors from Anglo-Saxon times onwards." Garner's Modern American Usage adds, "It is rank superstition that this coordinating conjunction  cannot properly begin a sentence." The word "but" suffers from similar misconceptions. Garner says, "It is a gross canard that beginning a sentence with but is stylistically slipshod. In fact, doing so is highly desirable in any number of contexts, as many style books have said (many correctly pointing out that but is more effective than however at the beginning of a sentence)". Fowler's echoes this sentiment: "The widespread public belief that But should not be used at the beginning of a sentence seems to be unshakeable. Yet it has no foundation."

Misconception: The passive voice is incorrect. It is a misconception that the passive voice is always incorrect in English and some "writing tutors" believe that the passive voice is to be avoided in all cases. However, "there are legitimate uses for the passive voice," says Paul Brians. Mignon Fogarty also points out that "passive sentences aren't incorrect," and "If you don't know who is responsible for an action, passive voice can be the best choice." When the active or passive voice can be used without much awkwardness, there are differing opinions about which is preferable. Bryan A. Garner notes, "Many writers talk about passive voice without knowing exactly what it is. In fact, many think that any BE-VERB signals passive voice."

Misconception: "Double negative" describes an incorrect usage. While some people use the term "double negative" only to refer to the nonstandard use of a second negative to emphasise an already existing negation, the term can also refer to the usage of two negatives in an expression that can be interpreted as either a positive or a neutral statement, which is generally considered standard. For example, one could say "I am not unconvinced of that" to mean that one is convinced but with an emphasis on the absence of skepticism.

Usage

Misconception: Paragraphs must comprise at least three sentences. Richard Nordquist states that "no rule exists regarding the number of sentences that make up a paragraph," noting that professional writers use "paragraphs as short as a single word". According to the Oxford Guide to Plain English: If you can say what you want to say in a single sentence that lacks a direct connection with any other sentence, just stop there and go on to a new paragraph. There's no rule against it. A paragraph can be a single sentence, whether long, short, or middling.
The University of North Carolina at Chapel Hill's Writing Center states on its website, "Many students define paragraphs in terms of length: a paragraph is a group of at least five sentences, a paragraph is half a page long, etc." The website explains, "Length and appearance do not determine whether a section in a paper is a paragraph. For instance, in some styles of writing, particularly journalistic styles, a paragraph can be just one sentence long."

According to Edwin Herbert Lewis's The History of the English Paragraph (1894), many of history's greatest writers used one- and two-sentence paragraphs in their works, especially, but not exclusively, in dialogue: Defoe, Bunyan, Laurence Sterne, Spenser, Scott, Dickens, Fielding, Hobbes, Bacon, George Eliot, Johnson, Locke, Lamb, Swift, De Quincey, Addison, Ruskin, Dryden, Sidney, and Milton.

Misconception: Contractions are not appropriate in proper English. Bill Walsh lists this as one of the "big myths of English usage" and Patricia T. O'Conner and Stewart Kellerman write, "A lot of people ... still seem to think that contractions are not quite ... quite. If you do too, you're quite wrong." Writers such as Shakespeare, Samuel Johnson, and others since Anglo-Saxon days have been "shrinking English". Some opinion makers in the 17th and 18th century eschewed contractions, but beginning in the 1920s, usage guides have allowed them. "Most writing handbooks now recommend contractions", but "there are still lots of traditionalists out there who haven't gotten the word", contributing to the modern misconception that contractions are forbidden. A number of writing guides still recommend avoiding contractions in academic and formal writing.

Misconception: "I feel badly" is the correct negative response to "How do you feel?" The expression "I feel badly" is often used in English, although "I feel badly" literally means "When it comes to feeling, I do it poorly." According to Paul Brians in Common Errors in English Usage, " 'I feel bad' is standard English", and " 'I feel badly' is an incorrect hyper-correction by people who think they know better than the masses."

Semantics
Misconception: "Healthy" has only recently been used to describe food. It is true that the adjective "healthful" has been pushed out in favour of "healthy" in recent times. However, the distinction between the words dates only to the 19th century. Before that, the words were used interchangeably; some examples date to the 16th century. According to Professor Paul Brians, "Many argue 'people are healthy, but vegetables are healthful'"; however, "phrases like 'part of a healthy breakfast' have become so widespread that they are rarely perceived as erroneous except by the hyper-correct."

Misconception: Non-standard, slang, or colloquial words are not real words. For instance, despite appearing as a word in numerous dictionaries, "irregardless" is dismissed as "not a word" in some style guides. All words in English originated by becoming commonly used during a certain time period, so although there are many vernacular words currently not accepted as part of the standard language, or regarded as infelicitous in formal speech or writing, it does not follow that they are somehow not words. Examples of words that are sometimes alleged to be "not a word" include "conversate", "gonna", "ain't", "funnest", "impactful", "mentee" and "thusly". All of these appear in numerous dictionaries as English words.

Misconception: "Inflammable" means something that cannot burn. " 'Flammable' and 'inflammable' both mean 'easy to catch on fire', but so many people misunderstand the latter term that it's better to stick with 'flammable' in safety warnings", says Brians.

Misconception: "Nauseous" cannot mean suffering from nausea. Some writers on language, such as Theodore Bernstein and Bill Bryson, have advanced the idea that "nauseous" means only causing nausea (i.e., nauseating), not suffering from it (nauseated), and that it is therefore incorrect to say "I am nauseous" unless one means to say "I inspire nausea in others". This prescription is contradicted by vast evidence from English usage, and Merriam-Webster finds no source for the rule before a published letter by a physician, Deborah Leary, in 1949.

Notes

a.For example, among the top ten usage "errors" submitted to the BBC was the supposed prohibition against using double negatives.
b.The Churchill Centre describes a similar version as "An invented phrase put in Churchill's mouth".
c.Chicago elaborates by noting Charles Allen Lloyd's observations on this phenomenon: "Next to the groundless notion that it is incorrect to end an English sentence with a preposition, perhaps the most wide-spread of the many false beliefs about the use of our language is the equally groundless notion that it is incorrect to begin one with "but" or "and." As in the case of the superstition about the prepositional ending, no textbook supports it, but apparently about half of our teachers of English go out of their way to handicap their pupils by inculcating it. One cannot help wondering whether those who teach such a monstrous doctrine ever read any English themselves."
d.These authors are quick to point out, however, that the passive voice is not necessarily better—it's simply a myth that the passive voice is wrong. For example, Brians states that, "it's true that you can make your prose more lively and readable by using the active voice much more often," and Fogarty points out that "passive sentences aren't incorrect; it's just that they often aren't the best way to phrase your thoughts".
e. Or any other arbitrary number.

See also
Disputes in English grammar
Linguistic prescription
List of English words with disputed usage
Split infinitive
Folk linguistics
Scientific writing

References

Bibliography

Dictionaries

External links
 
  Lists additional published sources that comment on ending a sentence with a preposition.

English language
English usage
English usage controversies